The Marriage Bond is a lost 1916 silent film drama directed by Lawrence Marston and starring Nat C. Goodwin. It was released on a State Rights basis.

Cast
Nat C. Goodwin - John Harwood
Margaret Green - Jane Wilton

unbilled
Raymond Bloomer
Anne Jeffson
P. J. Rollow
Loel Steuart

References

External links

1916 films
American silent feature films
American films based on plays
Lost American films
American black-and-white films
Silent American drama films
1916 drama films
1916 lost films
Lost drama films
Films directed by Lawrence Marston
1910s American films